Bistable may refer to:
 Bistability in physics; something that can rest in two states
 Bistable circuit, also known as a flip-flop or latch

See also